Callangate or Ccallangate is a mountain massif in the Vilcanota mountain range of the Andes in Peru. Another peak in the massif is called Ccallangate. It lies in the Cusco Region, Quispicanchi Province, Ocongate District. Collpa Ananta is the second-highest peak in Cusco, and ranks as the 24th highest in Peru.

First ascent 
Callangate was first climbed by Germans Günther Hauser and Bernhard Kuhn on 30 July 1957.

Elevation 
Other data from available digital elevation models: SRTM 6104 metres. The height of the nearest key col is 4707 meters, leading to a topographic prominence of 1403 meters. Callangate is considered a Mountain Subrange according to the Dominance System  and its dominance is 22.96%. Its parent peak is Ausangate and the Topographic isolation is 9.7 kilometers.

References

External links 

 Elevation information about Callangate
 Weather Forecast at Callangate

See also
 Condoriquiña
 Comercocha
 List of mountains in Peru
 List of mountains in the Andes

Mountains of Cusco Region
Mountains of Peru
Six-thousanders of the Andes